Nuclear factor I (NF-I) is a family of closely related transcription factors. They constitutively bind as dimers to specific sequences of DNA with high affinity. Family members contain an unusual DNA binding domain that binds to the recognition sequence  5'-TTGGCXXXXXGCCAA-3'.

Subtypes include:
 NFIA
 NFIB
 NFIC
 NFIX

References

Transcription factors